Teskey is a village in Batken Region of Kyrgyzstan. It is part of the Kadamjay District. Its population was 191 in 2021.

Nearby towns and villages include Aydarken and Kichi-Aydarken.

References

External links 
Satellite map at Maplandia.com

Populated places in Batken Region